Ancistrus vericaucanus is a species of catfish in the family Loricariidae. It is native to South America, where it occurs in the basin of the Cauca River, which is a tributary of the Magdalena River, in Colombia. It reaches 7.2 cm (2.8 inches) SL. Its congener Ancistrus caucanus was once thought to inhabit the Cauca River basin and was named after the river itself, but it was determined in 2013 that A. caucanus was not actually native to the Cauca. The specific epithet of A. vericaucanus means "true caucanus", in reference to the misleading name of A. caucanus.

References 

vericaucanus
Fish described in 2013